Herbert Scott Perry (April 17, 1891 – October 27, 1959) was a professional baseball pitcher who played in Major League Baseball from 1915 to 1921 for the St. Louis Browns, Chicago Cubs, Cincinnati Reds and Philadelphia Athletics. He was born in Denison, Texas.

External links

1891 births
1959 deaths
Major League Baseball pitchers
Baseball players from Texas
Philadelphia Athletics players
St. Louis Browns players
Chicago Cubs players
Cincinnati Reds players
Atlanta Crackers players